The Reference 54 is a type of alto and tenor saxophone, and part of the Reference series by musical instrument manufacturing company Henri Selmer Paris.

See also
 Henri Selmer Paris

References

Saxophones